Min-sung Choi (born 16 October 1992) is a Guamanian international footballer of Korean descent who plays for Strykers in the Guam Men's Soccer League.

Career
Choi was the Guam Men's Soccer League top scorer in the 2008–2009 season with 35 goals and joint top scorer in the 2009–2010 season with 28 goals.

International
Choi was called up for the Guam national football team in March 2015 for the friendlies against Hong Kong national football team and Singapore national football team.

References

1992 births
Living people
Guamanian footballers
Guam international footballers
Guamanian people of Korean descent
Association football forwards